Miejska Wieś  is a village in the administrative district of Gmina Jeziorany, within Olsztyn County, Warmian-Masurian Voivodeship, in northern Poland.

The village has a population of 490.

References

Villages in Olsztyn County